"All I Really Want" is a song written by Alanis Morissette and Glen Ballard, and produced by Ballard for Morissette's third album, Jagged Little Pill (1995). It was released as the album's sixth and final single in the United Kingdom in November 1996, in the United States the following month, and in Australia in February 1997. The song is also the opening track of Jagged Little Pill. It was the last song written for Jagged Little Pill but originated from a song called "The Bottom Line", which was the first song Morissette wrote with Glen Ballard.

The single peaked at number 14 on the US Billboard Modern Rock Tracks chart in December 1995, number 40 on the ARIA Charts in Australia and number 59 on the UK Singles Chart in December 1996.

Lyrics
Alanis compares herself to Estella from Charles Dickens' novel Great Expectations while having a confrontation with her partner about their uncomfortable relationship.

Music video
The song has no official video, but there was a promo video that contained footage from concerts and the videos for "You Oughta Know" and "Hand in My Pocket".

Track listing
"All I Really Want" – 4:42
"Ironic" (Live from Sydney) – 4:34
"Hand in My Pocket" (Live from Brisbane) – 4:34

Charts

Covers
 Louis Durra recorded a jazz version with DJ Rob Swift.  Released on "Tangled Up In Blue EP" and "Arrogant Doormats" (2011).

References

 [ "Alanis Morissette – Billboard Singles"]. AllMusic. Retrieved August 23, 2006.

1995 singles
1996 singles
1997 singles
Alanis Morissette songs
Songs written by Alanis Morissette
Songs written by Glen Ballard
Song recordings produced by Glen Ballard
Maverick Records singles
1995 songs